Camelina alyssum is a species of flowering plant belonging to the family Brassicaceae.

Its native range is Europe to Caucasus.

References

Brassicaceae